Heritage College is a provincially accredited private career college located in Calgary, Alberta. Founded in 2014 as the Noor Pharmacy Training Centre, the institute subsequently rebranded as Heritage College in 2016.

Programs
Heritage College offers programs in Healthcare and Business.

Healthcare
Pharmacy Assistant (4-month diploma)
Unit Clerk & Medical Office Administration (6-month certificate)
International Pharmacy Graduate Bridging Program (6-month accreditiation)

Business
Accounting and Payroll Administration (1-year certificate)
Retail Administration (1-year diploma)

See also
Education in Alberta
List of colleges in Alberta
List of universities and colleges in Alberta

References

Universities and colleges in Calgary
Colleges in Alberta
Vocational education in Canada
2016 establishments in Alberta
Educational institutions established in 2016